Stigmella kurilensis is a moth of the family Nepticulidae. It is only known from Hokkaido (Japan) and Kunashiri Island (southern Kurils).

It does not resemble any other nepticulid and its generic placement is therefore difficult to assess. Puplesis (1987, 1994) placed it in a separate monotypic species group in Stigmella. Double fasciae are rare in Nepticulidae, but occur frequently in the Asiatic species of Enteucha and in most Ectoedemia subgenus Etainia species. However, S. kurilensis does not share important apomorphic characters with these. The abdominal tufts are also remarkable. These kinds of tufts on segments other than 8 occur in most Trifurcula and in the Acalyptris repeteki group, however these genera belong to the tribe Trifurculini, and S. kurilensis does not share any of its apomorphies.

Adults are on wing in early June and August. There are probably two generations per year.

The host plant is unknown.

External links
Redescription of Stigmella kudensis PupIesis (Lepidoptera, Nepticulidae), found on Hokkaido

Nepticulidae
Moths of Japan
Moths of Asia
Moths described in 1987